Solar power in Hungary has been rapidly advancing. By the end of 2015 Hungary had installed more than 159 megawatt (MW) of photovoltaics. The country's solar power capacity robustly grew to 2852 MWs by 2021. In 2021, the share of solar in electric power generation was the highest in the European Union at 11.1%.

Photovoltaics

Photovoltaics (PV) are expected to grow dramatically in the next few years.

Solar PV deployment in MWp since 2010

List of photovoltaic power stations

Photovoltaic power stations (<10MWp)

Under construction and proposed solar parks
PV Solarys; Bátonyterenye 20 MW (proposed)
Mátra Power Plant; Bükkábrány 20 MW (second quarter of 2019) and Halmajugra (proposed)
Tiszaszőlős 11.6 MW (second half of 2019)
MOL Solar Parks; Füzesgyarmat, Tiszaújváros and Százhalombatta 18.38 MW (second half of 2019)
Alteo Solar Parks; Balatonberény and Nagykőrös 7-7 MW (2019 June)
Photon Energy Solar Pakrs; Fertőd 0.5 MW, Almásfüzitő 5.5 MW and Tiszakécske 5.5 MW (second half of 2019)
Solar Markt Solar Pakrs; Söjtör 3.1 MW, and Kőszeg 3.9 MW (second half of 2019)

Biggest owners
MVM Group: 
More than 5 MWp: Felsőzsolca, Paks, Pécs, Visonta
Less than 5 MWp: 
MET Power: Százhalombatta
Solar Markt: Csepreg, Kőszeg, Söjtör, Vép
ALTEO Group: Balatonberény (7 MWp), Nagykőrös (7 MWp), Monor (4 MWp)

See also

Renewable energy in Hungary
Energy in Hungary
List of renewable energy topics by country
Solar power in the European Union

References

External links

Hungarian Solar Panel and Collector Association 
Hungarian Energy and Public utility Regulatory Authority
MVM Solar 2018
alternativenergia.hu
NRGreport.com